BNS Durjoy is a Type 037-class submarine chaser of the Bangladesh Navy. She served the Bangladesh Navy from 1985 to 1995.

Career
BNS Durjoy was commissioned to the Bangladesh Navy on 1 December 1985. In 1995, she was damaged beyond repair and subsequently decommissioned. She served the Bangladesh Navy for about nine years.

Electronics
The ship uses a Pot Head radar as primary electronics. It is a surface search radar which is effective in performing mine laying operations. For ASW operations, she uses Chinese SJD-3 telescoping high frequency active sonar. Instead of being fixed to the hull, SJD-3 has a telescoping arm, so when not in use, the sonar is stored in the hull, and when deployed, the sonar is lowered into water several meter below the hull, thus increasing the detection range by avoiding buffeting generated by the hull.

Armament
The primary armaments of the ship are two twin 57mm 70-cal Type 76 DP guns and two twin 25mm 60cal Type 61 guns. Besides these, she carries a variety of weapons to perform ASW missions.  The ASW weapons are four RBU-1200 (Type 81) (5-barrel) ASW rockets, two BMB-2 ASW mortars, and two depth charge rails with 20 depth charges.

See also
List of historic ships of the Bangladesh Navy
BNS Nirbhoy

References

Ships of the Bangladesh Navy
Submarine chasers of Bangladesh Navy